Yoshihide Yoshida (10 October 1962) is a Japanese Military leader, serving in the Japan Ground Self-Defense Force. Currently serving as the Chief of the Ground Staff, Yoshida is the highest ranked person in the JGSDF, currently in command of around 150,000 Soldiers. He also is the first person to become a General Officer in the JSDF that did not graduate from the National Defense Academy in over 30 years.

Early life and education 
Born in a hospital in Tokyo, Yoshihide Yoshida was born on 30 October 1962. As a child, he was known for his gentle looks and stubborn nature. He was raised in Tokyo, but often moved in his teen years due to his fathers job. He went to the prestigious Tokyo University where he majored in Urban Engineering, here he became interested in the "world of the SDF" After he graduated he commissioned into the JGSDF where he would remain.

Military career 
On 8 March 2018, Yoshida was present at the 8th Division Reorganization Ceremony at Camp Kita Kumantoto where he served as the base commander. On 26 March 2021, Yoshida was appointed to the Chief of the Ground Staff of the JGSDF, the highest position in the service. On 3 June 2021, Yoshida had announced that he had a telephone conference with Fillipino Defense Minister Lorenzana. They discussed higher levels of co-operation. On 24 June 2021, Yoshida had announced that he had a telephone conference with Chief of Defense Staff of India. On 2 December 2021, Yoshida announced new cyber-initiatives to be taken by the JGSDF, in co-operation with the US Navy and Army.

References 

1962 births
Living people
Chiefs of Staff of the Japan Ground Self-Defense Force
People from Tokyo
University of Tokyo alumni